The Pravasi Bharatiya Samman (Overseas Indian Honour/Award) is the highest Indian award for Non-resident Indian and Overseas Citizen of India or an organisation or institution established and run by Non-Resident Indians or Persons of Indian Origin, constituted by the Ministry of Overseas Indian Affairs, Government of India in conjunction with the Pravasi Bharatiya Divas (Non-Resident Indian Day), to honour exceptional and meritorious contribution in their chosen field/profession. The award is given by the President of India. Since 2016, the Government of India has doubled the number of awardees each year to 30 after a decision to grant the award once every two years.

Award criteria

Pravasi Bharatiya Samman (PBS) is conferred for outstanding contributions in any of the following areas:

Awardees for 2003

Awardees for 2004

Awardees for 2005

Awardees for 2006

Awardees for 2007

Awardees for 2008

Awardees for 2009

Awardees for 2010

Awardees for 2011

Awardees for 2012

Awardees for 2013

Awardees for 2014

Awardees for 2015

Awardees for 2017

Awardees for 2019

Awardees for 2021

References

External links
 Pravasi Bharatiya Samman, Official webpage at Ministry of External Affairs (MEA)
 Pravasi Bharatiya Divas, Official Website
 List of Previous Pravasi Bhartiya Samman Awardees MOIA archived website

Civil awards and decorations of India
Indian diaspora
Awards established in 2003